Aleksandr Andreyevich Morgunov (born 4 June 1995) is a Russian football central midfielder. He plays for FC Saturn Ramenskoye.

Club career
He made his debut in the Russian Second Division for FC Akademiya Tolyatti on 18 May 2012 in a game against FC Syzran-2003 Syzran.

He made his debut for the main squad of FC Krasnodar in the Russian Cup game against PFC Spartak Nalchik on 21 September 2016.

He made his Russian Football National League debut for FC Khimki on 17 July 2018 in a game against FC Luch Vladivostok.

References

External links
 Career summary by sportbox.ru 
 
 
 

1995 births
People from Proletarsky District, Rostov Oblast
Sportspeople from Rostov Oblast
Living people
Russian footballers
Russian expatriate footballers
Association football midfielders
Russia youth international footballers
Russia under-21 international footballers
FC Dynamo Moscow reserves players
FC Krasnodar players
FC Krasnodar-2 players
FC Milsami Orhei players
FC Khimki players
FC Ararat Moscow players
FC Saturn Ramenskoye players
Russian expatriate sportspeople in Moldova
Expatriate footballers in Moldova